Thomas Furley Morres (12 September 1829 – 28 September 1884) was an Australian cricketer. He played six first-class cricket matches for Victoria.

See also
 List of Victoria first-class cricketers

References

1829 births
1884 deaths
Australian cricketers
Victoria cricketers
People from Wokingham
Melbourne Cricket Club cricketers